Charles Alexander Shaw (December 31, 1944 – April 12, 2020) was a United States district judge of the United States District Court for the Eastern District of Missouri.

Education and career

Born in Jackson, Tennessee, Shaw received a Bachelor of Arts degree from Harris Stowe State College in 1966, a Master of Business Administration from the University of Missouri in 1971, and a Juris Doctor from the Columbus School of Law at the Catholic University of America in 1974. He was an attorney with the appellate branch of the Division of Enforcement for the National Labor Relations Board from 1974 to 1976. He entered private practice in St. Louis, Missouri from 1976 to 1980, and then worked as an Assistant United States Attorney for the Eastern District of Missouri from 1980 to 1987. He then became a state court judge in Missouri's 22nd Judicial Circuit from 1987 to 1993.

Federal judicial service

On October 25, 1993, Shaw was nominated by President Bill Clinton to a new seat on the United States District Court for the Eastern District of Missouri, created by 104 Stat. 5089. He was confirmed by the United States Senate on November 20, 1993, and received his commission on November 22, 1993. He assumed senior status on December 31, 2009 and died on April 12, 2020, aged 75.

See also 
 List of African-American federal judges
 List of African-American jurists

References

Sources

1944 births
2020 deaths
African-American judges
Assistant United States Attorneys
Columbus School of Law alumni
Harris–Stowe State University alumni
Judges of the United States District Court for the Eastern District of Missouri
Lawyers from St. Louis
Missouri state court judges
People from Jackson, Tennessee
United States district court judges appointed by Bill Clinton
University of Missouri alumni
20th-century American judges
21st-century American judges
21st-century African-American people